James Baird (born 25 May 1983) is a Scottish former professional footballer who played as a goalkeeper. He works as goalkeeper coach for the Trinidad and Tobago women's national team.

Playing career
After moving between a number of Scottish clubs, including Alloa Athletic, Faroese clubs and Trinidad and Tobago Professional Football League club Tobago United. He moved to Iceland in May 2017 to sign with Snæfell/UDN.

Baird made four appearances for Scotland U17 in 2001 and 2002.

Coaching career
Baird trained with the British Virgin Islands national team and played for the under 23's in a small local tournament but after eligibility problems, decided against representing the senior side. There has been rumours of a return in 2016 for the Caribbean cup. Baird is also the Technical Director and goalkeeper for the West Indies Football Association.

All throughout Baird's career he has also coached whilst playing, as a young player helping out with his hometown club Broxburn Colts goalkeepers to working with Coerver as Gk coach. His first real coaching role was with MB1905 ladies team where he coached whilst playing for the club, The team did well getting promotion to the top woman's division.
Baird has also coached T&T Highlanders, The West Indies National team and Guaya United in the Trinidad and Tobago Super league.

In summer 2021 Baird was appointed goalkeeper coach of the Trinidad and Tobago women's national team.

References

1983 births
Alloa Athletic F.C. players
Association football goalkeepers
Living people
Scottish expatriate footballers
Livingston F.C. players
Scottish footballers
Stenhousemuir F.C. players
Tobago United F.C. players
TT Pro League players
Edinburgh United F.C. players
A.F.C. Totton players
Scottish expatriate sportspeople in Trinidad and Tobago
Expatriate footballers in Trinidad and Tobago
Berwick Rangers F.C. players
Sportspeople from Broxburn, West Lothian
Footballers from West Lothian